This is a list of settlements in the Kilkis regional unit in Greece:

 Agia Paraskevi
 Agios Markos
 Agios Petros
 Akritas
 Amaranta
 Anavryto
 Anthofyto
 Antigoneia
 Aspros
 Axiochori
 Axioupoli
 Cherso
 Chorygi
 Chrysopetra
 Drosato
 Efkarpia
 Eiriniko
 Elliniko
 Eptalofos
 Evropos
 Evzonoi
 Fanos
 Filyria
 Fyska
 Gallikos
 Gerakari
 Gorgopi
 Goumenissa
 Griva
 Idomeni
 Iliolousto
 Isoma
 Kampanis
 Karpi
 Kastaneri
 Kastanies
 Kato Theodoraki
 Kentriko
 Kilkis
 Koiladi
 Kokkinia
 Korona
 Koronouda
 Kristoni
 Leipsydrio
 Limnotopos
 Livadia
 Mandres
 Mavroneri
 Megali Sterna
 Megali Vrysi
 Melanthio
 Mesia
 Mesiano
 Mikro Dasos
 Mikrokampos
 Mouries
 Myriofyto
 Nea Santa
 Neo Agioneri
 Neo Gynaikokastro
 Palaio Agioneri
 Pedino
 Pefkodasos
 Pentalofo
 Plagia, Kilkis
 Plagia, Paionia
 Polykastro
 Polypetro
 Pontoirakleia
 Pontokerasia
 Ryzia
 Skra
 Stathis
 Stathmos Mourion
 Stavrochori
 Terpyllos
 Theodosia
 Toumpa
 Tripotamos
 Vafiochori
 Vaptistis
 Vathy
 Xylokeratia

By municipality

See also

List of towns and villages in Greece

 
Kilkis